Wayne Community Schools may refer to:
 Wayne Community Schools (Nebraska)
 Wayne Community School District (Iowa)